Royal Air Force Waterbeach or more simply RAF Waterbeach is a former Royal Air Force station located in Waterbeach, Cambridgeshire which is about  north of Cambridge, England. The site was transferred to the Royal Engineers, part of the British Army, in 1966, as Waterbeach Barracks.

History

Royal Air Force
The airfield was built in 1940 on the northern edge of Waterbeach village and operated under the control of RAF Bomber Command. The original control tower and many RAF buildings, including several hangars, are still present.

RAF units and aircraft – Bomber Command, WW2

Transport Command, 1945-1949

After the Second World War, Consolidated B-24 Liberators and Douglas Dakotas from RAF Transport Command flew from RAF Waterbeach.

RAF units and aircraft – Transport Command

Fighter Command, 1950-1963
RAF Fighter Command took over the base on 1 March 1950 and used Gloster Meteors, Supermarine Swifts, de Havilland Venoms, de Havilland Vampires and Gloster Javelins.  In addition Hawker Hunter fighters arrived in May 1955 and, two years later, the prototype English Electric P1 (Lightning) visited RAF Waterbeach.

RAF units and aircraft – Fighter Command

After the last RAF fixed-wing aircraft, from No. 54 Squadron RAF, left in August 1963, the site was used by the Airfield Construction Branch RAF until 1966.

Royal Engineers
In 1966 the station and airfield remained the property of the Ministry of Defence, but was transferred from the Royal Air Force to the Royal Engineers, part of the British Army, as Waterbeach Barracks. Until the closure of nearby RAF Oakington in the early 1970s, the main runway at Waterbeach remained active, along with the control tower, and was used as a relief landing ground for Varsities used in the advanced pilot training role. The former airfield was used as a training area for troops, with occasional visits by helicopters and, in the past, by Harriers.

See also
 List of former Royal Air Force stations

References

Citations

Bibliography
 (available from Waterbeach Military Heritage Museum)

External links

 Waterbeach Barracks and Airfield (Urban&Civic)
 Waterbeach Military Heritage Museum (former Barracks Museum)
 12 (Force Support) Engineer Group, Royal Engineers (now at RAF Wittering) 
 39 Engineer Regiment (Air Support), Royal Engineers (now at Kinloss Barracks)

1940 establishments in the United Kingdom
Royal Air Force stations in Cambridgeshire
Royal Air Force stations of World War II in the United Kingdom
Military aviation museums in England
RAF